Deadfall is a 2012 American crime drama film directed by Stefan Ruzowitzky, written by Zach Dean, and starring Eric Bana, Olivia Wilde, and Charlie Hunnam.

Plot
After a successful casino heist, siblings Addison and Liza go on the run in Michigan. They decide to split up when their driver is fatally injured in a car crash and Addison murders a state trooper responding to the scene. They resolve to cross the U.S.-Canadian border during a blizzard. Meanwhile, after being released from prison, former boxer Jay calls his parents, retired sheriff Chet and his wife June, to say he'll be home for Thanksgiving. He confronts his former coach in Detroit, demanding money owed him. The two get into a fight and Jay, thinking he has killed him and unwilling to return to jail, flees.

Hannah, the sheriff's deputy, is invited to join Jay's parents for Thanksgiving dinner. She is treated poorly by her father, Sheriff Becker, who does not want to include her in the hunt for the fugitives. Hannah, who has been accepted to be trained for the FBI, excuses her father's behavior because of the loss of his wife several years ago. Jay finds a shivering Liza in the road and offers her a ride to the nearest gas station. Meanwhile, wandering in the snow, Addison murders an elderly man  losing a little finger in the struggle  and steals his damaged snowmobile. He is later forced to abandon the snowmobile, but not before cauterizing his wound on the still hot engine.

When Jay and Liza stop at a bar during the blizzard, she sneaks back to his truck, finds Jay's address, and leaves Addison a message to meet her there. A romantic relationship develops between Jay and Liza, who have sex in a motel. Elsewhere, Addison invades a cabin in the woods and kills the abusive father of the family. After dumping the man's body, he tends to the distraught wife and her children. Hannah is called to investigate the situation in the cabin. Meanwhile, realizing that she has feelings for Jay, Liza calls Addison to say she couldn't proceed with the plan and that she'll find another ride. Jay confesses his feelings for her. Liza explains how her brother was her protector from their abusive father, who was killed when they were young.

Hannah and two officers reach the cabin. Hannah notices a man's corpse and tries to warn the officer at the door, but Addison shoots him with a shotgun. Addison flees on a snowmobile with Hannah and the other officer giving chase, and the officer is killed.

Addison arrives at Jay's house and holds his parents captive. When Liza and Jay arrive for Thanksgiving dinner, Addison pretends at first not to know who Liza is. They eat dinner together. Addison sees Liza act protectively of Jay and his family. Hannah receives a call from a Detroit detective about Jay's coach, who is recovering from a concussion. She goes to the house and is also taken captive by Addison.

Becker finds Addison's snowmobile at the house, draws a weapon and goes inside. He fires at Addison, but it turns out to be his daughter, Hannah, surreptitiously dressed by Addison in his own jacket. Becker is then shot by Addison. A struggle between Jay and Addison ensues outside. Jay overpowers Addison but releases him when Liza begs him to, reminding Jay that Addison is her brother. Addison points another gun at Jay and challenges Jay to proclaim his love for Liza, which Jay does. Before Addison can decide what to do next, Liza fatally shoots him. Other police arrive to discover Hannah's life has been saved by a bulletproof vest.

Cast
 Eric Bana as Addison
 Olivia Wilde as Liza
 Charlie Hunnam as Jay Mills
 Kris Kristofferson as Chet Mills
 Alain Goulem as Bobby
 Allison Graham as Mandy
 Sissy Spacek as June Mills
 Kate Mara as Deputy Hannah Becker
 Treat Williams as Sheriff Marshall T. Becker
 Jason Cavalier as Deputy Travis
 Maxime Savaria as Deputy Brice
 Tom Jackson as Old Indian Hunter

Background
As a passenger on JetBlue Flight 292 in 2005, flying for hours in a figure 8 over Southern California to prepare for a risky landing, Zach Dean contemplated his mortality and resolved to write a screenplay about family. The rights to the script, originally titled Kin, were optioned by Mutual Films and in 2010 it was reported that Bana, Wilde, and Hunnam were in casting talks. Shooting began in Canada in 2011.

Release
Deadfall premiered at the 2012 Tribeca Festival. It opened in theaters on December 7, 2012.

Critical reception

Deadfall received negative reviews and has a rating of 35% on Rotten Tomatoes based on 81 reviews with an average rating of 4.93 out of 10. The film also has a score of 52 out of 100 on Metacritic based on 24 reviews. According to, the film scored a 6.2 out of 10 stars with 39,570 star reviews. Over 23,000 of these star reviews were in the 6-7 range with only 18.0% of these climbing into the 8-10 range.

References

External links
 
 
 
 

2012 films
2010s English-language films
American chase films
American road movies
2010s road movies
Films directed by Stefan Ruzowitzky
Films scored by Marco Beltrami
Mutual Film Company films
2010s American films